Roman Lewis (1864–1918) was a prominent Jewish anarchist in New York. Fluent in Russian and Yiddish, he was the first editor of the Yiddish-language anarchist newspaper Fraye Arbeter Shtime. For a time, Lewis was the Pioneers of Liberty's best speaker. Lewis attended gymnasium in Russia. In New York, when he wasn't working at making shirts, he spent his leisure time with the anarchist movement and spoke at Jewish union rallies. He later became a Social-Democrat, attended law school in Chicago, where he remained. He was elected an assistant district attorney in Chicago as a Democrat. Lewis committed suicide in Cincinnati in 1918.

After Alexander Berkman failed to assassinate Henry Frick in 1892, Berkman's cousin Modest Stein traveled to Pittsburgh to kill Frick himself. The police were tipped off before the attempt could be made, and Stein believed Lewis was the informant.

References

Bibliography

Further reading 

 

1864 births
1918 deaths
American anarchists
American people of Russian-Jewish descent
Editors of Fraye Arbeter Shtime
Jewish anarchists
Russian anarchists
Yiddish-language writers
1918 suicides
Suicides in Ohio